Lose My Mind may refer to:

 "Lose My Mind" (Brett Eldredge song), 2015
 "Lose My Mind" (Dean Lewis song), 2017
 "Lose My Mind" (The Wanted song), 2010 
 "Lose My Mind" (Young Jeezy song), 2010

See also
 Losing My Mind (disambiguation)
 Lost My Mind (disambiguation)
 Lost in My Mind (disambiguation)